Turret Peak is the sixth-highest peak (tied with Doublet Peak) in the U.S. state of Wyoming and the fifth-highest in the Wind River Range. The Dinwoody Glacier is located on the northwest slope of the mountain, while the Helen Glacier is to the south.

Hazards

Encountering bears is a concern in the Wind River Range. There are other concerns as well, including bugs, wildfires, adverse snow conditions and nighttime cold temperatures.

Importantly, there have been notable incidents, including accidental deaths, due to falls from steep cliffs (a misstep could be fatal in this class 4/5 terrain) and due to falling rocks, over the years, including 1993, 2007 (involving an experienced NOLS leader), 2015 and 2018. Other incidents include a seriously injured backpacker being airlifted near SquareTop Mountain in 2005, and a fatal hiker incident (from an apparent accidental fall) in 2006 that involved state search and rescue. The U.S. Forest Service does not offer updated aggregated records on the official number of fatalities in the Wind River Range.

References

External links
 General Information on the Wind River Range
 Climbing the Wind River Range (more)
 Glaciers in the Wind River Range
 Shoshone National Forest Federal website
 Continental Divide Trail information

Bridger–Teton National Forest
Greater Yellowstone Ecosystem
Landforms of Fremont County, Wyoming
Mountain ranges of Wyoming
Mountains of Fremont County, Wyoming
Mountains of Wyoming
Ranges of the Rocky Mountains
Shoshone National Forest